The 1962 Humboldt State Lumberjacks football team represented Humboldt State College during the 1962 NCAA College Division football season. Humboldt State competed in the Far Western Conference (FWC).

The 1962 Lumberjacks were led by head coach Phil Sarboe in his twelfth year at the helm. They played home games at the Redwood Bowl in Arcata, California. Humboldt State finished with a record of seven wins and two losses (7–2, 3–2 FWC). The Lumberjacks outscored their opponents 217–56 for the season.

Schedule

Team players in the NFL
The following Humboldt State players were selected in the 1963 NFL Draft.

The following finished their college career in 1962, were not drafted, but played in the NFL.

Notes

References

Humboldt State
Humboldt State Lumberjacks football seasons
Humboldt State Lumberjacks football